Positive Spiral is the twelfth studio album by Japanese J-pop singer and songwriter Maki Ohguro. It was released on 30 January 2008 under EMI Japan. The album was released on her 15th debut anniversary celebration.

This album consist of only previously released singles, Kore de Ii no?!/Koi no Akuma -She's no Angel-. This is her the first album which is released in two formats: regular CD edition and limited CD+DVD edition. DVD disc consist of three music videoclips and CD disc unreleased bonus tracks.

The album reached No. 39 in its first week on the Oricon chart. The album sold 9,000 copies.

This is her last album which was released under EMI Japan. Her next studio album, Suppin is released under 32 Records label.

Track listing

In media
Positive Spiral: theme song for Nihon TV program NNN News Real Time

References

Universal Music Japan albums
Japanese-language albums
2008 albums
Maki Ohguro albums